Snake Rocks is a mountain located in the Catskill Mountains of New York south of Bearsville. Acorn Hill is located west-northwest, and Ohayo Mountain is located east-southeast of Snake Rocks.

References

Mountains of Ulster County, New York
Mountains of New York (state)